Nyctemera tripunctaria is a moth of the family Erebidae first described by Carl Linnaeus in his 1758 10th edition of Systema Naturae. It is found in southern China, Cambodia, Thailand, Vietnam, Sundaland, the Philippines and on Sulawesi.

Adults are day flying.

Subspecies
Nyctemera tripunctaria tripunctaria
Nyctemera tripunctaria aequimargo (Rothschild, 1920)
Nyctemera tripunctaria assimile (Snellen van Vollenhoven, 1863) (Java)
Nyctemera tripunctaria celsa Walker, 1864 (Cambodia, southern China)
Nyctemera tripunctaria cydippe Weymer, 1885 (Nias)
Nyctemera tripunctaria lombokiana (Swinhoe, 1903)
Nyctemera tripunctaria simalura Roepke, 1957 (Simalur Island)
Nyctemera tripunctaria subvelata Walker, 1864 (Sulawesi)

References

 

Nyctemerina
Moths described in 1758
Taxa named by Carl Linnaeus